People's Park is an urban public park in Donghu District of central Nanchang, capital of Jiangxi province, China. It has more than 14,000 trees of 175 different species. Its layout is in the style of typical Chinese gardens of the Jiangnan region. It is popular with local residents and tourists alike.

The park was established in 1954 and originally called New Park. It was renamed as People's Park in 1958. It is known for its orchid garden, created in 1963 at the suggestion of Marshal Zhu De. The park's name is inscribed in Zhu's calligraphy.

People's Park is located at 96 Fuzhou Road in Donghu District, south of the Jiangxi Stadium and north of the old Jiangxi Provincial Government. Admission to the park is free.

References

Parks in Jiangxi
Urban public parks
Tourist attractions in Jiangxi
Nanchang
1954 establishments in China